Alfred Thomas Hack (12 June 1905 – 4 February 1933) was a cricketer who played first-class cricket for South Australia from 1927 to 1931.

Hack was most successful in his first two seasons, when he also kept wicket. After Charlie Walker took over as South Australia's wicket-keeper, Hack played as a batsman. He scored his only century in South Australia's victory over Queensland in 1928-29.

His father Frederick and brother Reginald also played cricket for South Australia.

Hack was a schoolteacher. After postings in the Adelaide suburb of Brighton and at the small settlement of Paris Creek, near Strathalbyn, he was appointed to the school at Glenelg, but died suddenly of acute appendicitis shortly after taking up the position. He was 27 years old.

References

External links

Alfred Hack at CricketArchive

1905 births
1933 deaths
Australian cricketers
South Australia cricketers
Cricketers from Adelaide
Deaths from appendicitis